Ena Saha (born 28 May 1996), is an Indian film and television actress who predominantly appears in Bengali films and television shows.

Career
She has appeared in a number of Bengali TV serials, including Raat Bhor Bristi, Bou Katha Kau and  Bandhan.

She has appeared in several commercial and art-house Bengali films and a Malayalam film. Her first film is the Bengali film Ami Aadu, directed by Somnath Gupta. In the film 1:30 am she played the role of Nishi. The film was well received by critics in several film festivals. In 2013, she appeared in the Malayalam film Neelakasham Pachakadal Chuvanna Bhoomi, where she played the character Gauri.

She is now a Producer along with her mom Banani Saha under the banner of 'Jarek Entertainments'.

Filmography

Web series

TV shows

References

External links
 
 

Actresses in Bengali cinema
Indian film actresses
Living people
Place of birth missing (living people)
Actresses from Kolkata
Bengali actresses
Actresses in Malayalam cinema
Actresses in Hindi cinema
Actresses in Telugu cinema
Bengali television actresses
21st-century Indian actresses
Bigg Boss Bangla contestants
1992 births